"Summertime Sadness" is a song by American singer-songwriter Lana Del Rey from her second studio album, Born to Die (2012). The pop ballad was released on June 22, 2012, by Interscope Records as the fourth single of the album. In the spring of 2013, "Summertime Sadness" reached number one in Poland, Ukraine and Armenia. Charting across Europe, the single reached the top ten in Austria, Bulgaria, Germany, Greece, Luxembourg, and Switzerland. Trap and house remixes of "Summertime Sadness" helped Del Rey break into the US Hot Dance Club Songs chart. That chart is where Del Rey's song became a modest hit and marked her first foray into the chart. On the accompanied Dance/Mix Show Airplay chart, the single gave Del Rey her first US number-one single in August 2013.

In the summer of 2013, a remixed version of the track by Cedric Gervais was released to American contemporary hit radio and helped the single become a sleeper hit, debuting at 72 on the Billboard Hot 100 and becoming the highest-charting single of her career in the U.S. with a peak of 6. Switzerland and Austria gave "Summertime Sadness" a Gold certification; it reached platinum status in Germany and became a top 40 year-end hit. The record also reached number 4 in the UK Singles Chart. It joined BBC Radio 1's and BBC Radio 2's playlists. Gervais' remixed version won a 2014 Grammy Award for Best Remixed Recording, Non-Classical.

The song's accompanying music video depicts Del Rey and actress Jaime King as a couple. As the storyline progresses, both characters commit suicide by jumping from perilous heights. Cinematography was handled primarily by King's husband, Kyle Newman. The video gained success on video-hosting website YouTube, and circulated through social media websites such as Facebook and Twitter. In general, critics lauded the artistry of the single's music video, comparing it to Instagram. The musical arrangement was composed by Del Rey's long-time collaborators Emile Haynie and Rick Nowels, with Nowels and Del Rey writing the lyrics. The song is also referenced in the Chainsmokers' hit single "#Selfie".

In September 2021, the song was ranked number 456 on Rolling Stones 500 Greatest Songs of All Time.

Lyrical composition and themes

"Summertime Sadness" was released as a digital download on June 22, 2012, in Austria, Germany, and Switzerland. Written by Lana Del Rey and her long-time collaborator, Rick Nowels, the record was produced by Nowels and Emile Haynie. "Summertime Sadness" is a pop and trip hop ballad. Various club remixes of the song were created, including one by Ryan Hemsworth. Spin said Hemsworth's trap remix, "teases us with a little stoney dubwise bubble, and then dunks the entire thing into a glistening pool of purple promethazine goo. The only sharp sounds come from the barrage of skittering beats, plus some space lasers and the like." "Summertime Sadness"s Adam Freeland remix employed house beats and strong synthesizers that creates a "dazzling dance floor production."

The song's video focuses around a lesbian couple reminiscing on positive moments, before both commit suicide. Pop Dust writer Nate Jones compared the introductory lyrics, "I got my red dress on tonight/ Dancing in the dark in the pale moonlight" to "Dancing in the Dark" by Bruce Springsteen, affirming that the song's inherent somberness was building to its gloomy denouement by first displaying positive memories the song's lovers experienced. The following two stanzas of: "Got my hair up real big beauty queen style / High heels off, I'm feeling alive" and "Honey, I'm on fire, I feel it everywhere / Nothing scares me anymore" building on the same lyrical imagery. Lyrically, the song reaches the sadder conclusion with the chorus, "Kiss me hard before you go / Summertime sadness / I just wanted you to know/ That, baby, you're the best." The darkest portion of the song's story swells at the beginning of the second verse: "I'm feelin' electric tonight / Cruising down the coast goin' 'bout 99 / Got my bad baby by my heavenly side / I know if I go, I'll die happy tonight." As a whole, "Summertime Sadness" follows a typical pop song structure: verse, chorus, verse, chorus, bridge, chorus, with the chorus circulating several times before the song's end.

Critical reception
In his track-by-track review for Billboard magazine, Andrew Hampp wrote about "Summertime Sadness" that "the pouty title alone drew giggles at Del Rey's Bowery gig, but the song itself proves to be one of the more durable tracks here even if its lyrics start to get redundant ('Kiss me hard before you go... That baby you're the best')". Los Angeles Times named it among the best tracks on the album along with "Video Games" and "Dark Paradise".

Music video

The music video for "Summertime Sadness" was filmed in April 2012 in Santa Clarita, California. It was directed by Kyle Newman and Spencer Susser. Newman's wife, actress Jaime King, stars along with Del Rey in the video, which tells the sad story of two women, who both end their own lives. King said about the video that, "It's about not being able to live without the one you love, friend or lover it doesn't matter, that's whatever you want it to be." Actor Alex Pettyfer reportedly also helped out on set as a production assistant.

The radio edit of the video was released on July 20, 2012, in Germany on ClipFish. The same day, the video with the album version of the song was released on Lana Del Rey's YouTube channel. That week, Del Rey gained 69,000 new followers on both Facebook and Twitter.

Synopsis

The music video opens with a woman saying, "Remember, I'll always love you, bye". After the phone call, Del Rey sings the opening lyrics and jumps off the cliff. The next scenes tell the story about two women (played by Del Rey and Jaime King) who have become suicidal.

In the next scene, the forlorn King seeks out the nearest bridge in the city, then stands on its ledge in a tear-stricken state. The next scenes depict a statue of Jesus Christ, Del Rey looking onto the distance and a phone smashing into pieces as it hits the floor, hinting at Del Rey's realization that her girlfriend has killed herself. Feeling at fault for her lover's death, Del Rey spreads her arms wide mimicking the statue of Jesus Christ and jumps off the cliff.

The last scenes show both women in happier times, Del Rey turns to see King and smiles; both women are seen pouting and glancing seductively over their shoulders towards one another. As the women embrace, the smoke in the atmosphere gathers and they disappear. It's shown, after both suicides, that a haunting image of Del Rey (presumably her ghost) is seen walking down a long road towards the camera.

Reception
The video received generally favorable reviews from critics. Crystal Bell, a blogger for Huffington Post, called the video an "ode to Instagram," and compared it to Del Rey's previous videos. Carrie Battan of Pitchfork Media wrote, that "it's certainly no seven-minute re-enactment of the life of the Kennedy family, but it still offers the trademark LDR touch. Instagram-like footage, very forlorn faces, possible suicide attempts, and a very special guest." Jenna Hally Rubenstein, of MTV's Buzzworthy blog, considers that the coral-smoked scenes are Del Rey in the afterlife, post-suicide, saying it may be unlikely as, "the clip closes with an image of Lana and her ghost walking alone down an empty road." Further, she said, "Sad, sad times, y'all. But then again what else did you expect from a Lana video? Sunshine, glitter and ice cream cones? Probably not." Brennan Carley of Billboard noted that "keeping the buzz alive while sticking with sepia-tones and a healthy dose of melodramatics, Lana Del Rey probes a crumbling relationship in the music video [...] the video traces the women's relationship with spliced together film bits – much like the effects used in her earlier efforts – and foggy scenes of the stars pouting and glancing seductively over their shoulders." Spin magazine writer Marc Hogan found that the video recalled Del Rey's breakout video for "Video Games". He added, that "more provocative, though, is the hint of romance-gone-sour between Del Rey and the character played by actress Jaime King. Because this is a Lana Del Rey video, it's not spoiling anything to say there's a Thelma and Louise-like twist." Entertainment website Spinner called the visual "weird. It's beautifully shot, sepia-soaked and melodramatic. The singer's bestie, played by the very lovely actress Jamie King, is also pretty sad about summer ending." Tyler Monroe, writing for AUX, called the video "indistinguishable nothingness", adding "I don't think Lana Del Rey is even trying anymore."

Live performances
In 2012, Del Rey performed "Summertime Sadness" at the Irving Plaza, along with "Million Dollar Man", while drenched in purple lights. New York Times writer Bradley Sterns described Lana Del Rey's vocal style during the Irving Plaza performance as "lounge singer crooning". Along with "Million Dollar Man" and "Summertime Sadness", Del Rey also sang "Video Games", "Born to Die", "Lolita", and "Without You".

Miley Cyrus covered the song for BBC Radio1's Live Lounge.

Charts

Weekly charts

Year-end charts

Certifications

Cedric Gervais remix

In January 2013, a remix by Cedric Gervais was commissioned for the record label Universal Germany. However, the remix was initially turned down by Interscope and Polydor Records, Lana Del Rey's record labels in America and the UK, respectively, but was released on Spinnin' Records.  In the spring of 2013, the remix quickly surged to number one on Beatport, resulting in several radio programmers and DJs, such as Pete Tong, working the song into their radio station's rotation. BBC Radio 1  added the remix to its playlist, helping it to gain popularity around the world. Several Sirius XM radio stations began playing it, and Interscope decided to push at Top 40 radio in the United States. After positive feedback, Interscope agreed to release the remix.

Background
Hesitant to accept requests for remixes from other artists, Gervais immediately consented to assisting Del Rey with remixing "Summertime Sadness". He said, "Lana Del Rey came in. I didn't even ask how much money [...] I wasn't thinking if it was going to be a hit or not, I just love and respect the artist that she is." Satisfied with the finished product, Del Rey's team commissioned Gervais to produce a mix version of "Young and Beautiful".

The decision to release the new version of "Summertime Sadness" on the DJ's primary label, Spinnin' Records, was made by Cedric's manager Luke Allen (Red Light Management) to expand the song's audience to Gervais' EDM fanbase. Allen grew and built the record from grass roots, but it wasn't until he invited Interscope A&R John Ehmann to a performance at the Electric Daisy Carnival in Las Vegas that the major label came on board, after Ehmann heard 60,000 people singing along to the song. Months later, the house and Eurodance track was a sleeper hit, peaking at number 6 on Billboards Hot 100 chart. "In every country I'm going to, I hear my remix on the radio," the DJ commented on the song's success. "I started a long time ago in the business with the passion of being a DJ and all of the sudden I make a track like this I get even more excited and motivated." Becoming the most successful work of his career at the time, "Summertime Sadness" unlocked a plethora of opportunities for Gervais, including a contract for the release of a full-length album that features many high-profile dance singers, Rick Nowels (co-writer of "Summertime Sadness"s lyrics) assisting him.

Music video
Gervais' interpretation of "Summertime Sadness" received a video treatment. The majority of the video includes the same footage of the original version produced by Kyle Newman. Sam Lansky of Idolator described the remake as being "...stitched together with familiar glitchy footage of Lana in her conventional Tumblrwave style." Expanding, he said: "the euphoric house production contrasts with the melancholy aesthetic in that way that feels quintessentially Lana and, well, if nothing else, the track is straight fire." Further, Lansky remarked on the audio, stating: "The gloomy cut has received a proper single treatment" from Cedric Gervais who metamorphosed "Lana"s lachrymose original into a dancefloor stomper".

Charts

Weekly charts

Year-end charts

Decade-end charts

Certifications

Track listing 

German CD single
 "Summertime Sadness" (Radio Mix) – 4:12
 "Summertime Sadness" – 4:25

German remixes EP
 "Summertime Sadness" (Radio Mix) – 4:12
 "Summertime Sadness" – 4:25
 "Summertime Sadness" (Radio Mix, Extended Version) – 5:06
 "Summertime Sadness" (Hannes Fischer Nightflight Remix) – 6:41

German 12" remixes EP
 "Summertime Sadness" (Todd Terry Remix) – 6:35
 "Summertime Sadness" (Todd Terry Dub) – 5:37
 "Summertime Sadness" (Hannes Fischer Nightflight Remix) – 6:41
 "Summertime Sadness" (Marbert Rocel Remix) – 5:41

"Summertime Sadness" – Asadinho Remixes
 "Summertime Sadness" (Asadinho Main Vocal Mix) – 8:34
 "Summertime Sadness" (Asadinho Dub) – 7:45
 "Summertime Sadness" (Asadinho Instrumental) – 7:00

"Summertime Sadness" – Cedric Gervais Remix
 "Summertime Sadness" (Cedric Gervais Extended Remix) – 6:56
 "Summertime Sadness" (Cedric Gervais Remix) - 3:36

"Summertime Sadness" – Cedric Gervais Extended Remix
 "Summertime Sadness" (Cedric Gervais Remix) – 3:36
 "Summertime Sadness" (Cedric Gervais Extended Remix) - 6:56

"Summertime Sadness" – MK in the Air Remix
 "Summertime Sadness" (MK in the Air Remix) – 4:02

"Summertime Sadness" – Nick Warren Remixes
 "Summertime Sadness" (Nick Warren's Vocal Remix) – 10:34
 "Summertime Sadness" (Nick Warren's Skandik Dub) – 10:40
 "Summertime Sadness" (Nick Warren's Instrumental Remix) – 10:32

Credits and personnel
Credits for "Summertime Sadness" taken from Born to Die album liner.

 Lead vocals – Lana Del Rey
 Producers – Emile Haynie
 Co-producers  – Rick Nowels
 Lyrics – Lana Del Rey, Rick Nowels
 Label – Interscope Records
 Strings arranged and conduction – Larry Gold

 Flute – Dan Heath
 Additional strings, guitar, and keyboards – Patrick Warren
 Additional strings – Rick Nowels
 Additional pads – Devrim Karaoglu
 Mixer – Dan Grech Marguerat
 Assistant mixer – Duncan Fuller

Release history

Notes

References

External links

2010s ballads
2011 songs
2012 singles
Cedric Gervais songs
Eurodance songs
Grammy Award for Best Remixed Recording, Non-Classical
Interscope Records singles
Lana Del Rey songs
Number-one singles in Poland
Pop ballads
Song recordings produced by Emile Haynie
Songs about heartache
Songs about loneliness
Songs about suicide
Songs written by Lana Del Rey
Songs written by Rick Nowels
Spinnin' Records singles
Torch songs
Trip hop songs